The 2002 Canadian Figure Skating Championships were held between January 8 and 13, 2002 at the Copps Coliseum and Chedoke Arena in Hamilton, Ontario. They were the figure skating national championship held to determine the national champions of Canada. It was organized by Skate Canada, the nation's figure skating governing body. Skaters competed in the disciplines of men's singles, ladies' singles, pair skating, and ice dancing on the senior and junior levels. Due to the large number of competitors, the senior men's and senior ladies' qualifying rounds were split into two groups. Aside from determining the national champions, the event also served to help choose the Canadian teams to the 2002 Winter Olympics, the 2002 World Championships, the 2002 Four Continents Championships, and the 2002 World Junior Championships.

Senior results

Men

Ladies

Pairs

Ice dancing

Junior results

Men

Ladies

Pairs

Ice dancing

External links

 2002 Canadian Figure Skating Championships (Archived 2009-06-01)

Canadian Figure Skating Championships
Canadian Figure Skating Championships
2002 in Canadian sports
2002 in Ontario
Sports competitions in Hamilton, Ontario